The United States of America (USA) competed at the 1992 Summer Olympics in Barcelona, Spain. 545 competitors, 355 men and 190 women, took part in 248 events in 28 sports. At the closing ceremony, a segment of American culture was performed, as the country hosted the next Olympics in Atlanta.

The team finished second in the overall medal rankings, narrowly losing to the Unified Team, 108 to 112. The Unified Team was basically a Soviet team competing under a different name, as the USSR collapsed several months prior to the Games. The Americans greatly improved compared to the 1988 Olympics mainly due to the break-up of the Eastern Bloc and its doping system.

Medalists

The following U.S. competitors won medals at the games. In the by discipline sections below, medalists' names are bolded.

|style="text-align:left; width:78%; vertical-align:top;"|

|  style="text-align:left; width:22%; vertical-align:top;"|

* - Indicates that the athlete competed in preliminaries but not the final.

Competitors
The following is the list of number of competitors in the Games.

Archery

The United States won no medals in archery. Two individuals made it to the quarterfinals, as did both of the teams, but all were defeated there. The six archers combined for a 5-5 record in individual matches and a 2-2 record in team matches.

Men

Women

Athletics

Men
Track and road events

* - Athlete ran in the heat but not the final.

Field events

Combined events – Decathlon

Women
Track and road events

* - Athlete ran in the heat but not the final.

Field events

Combined events – Heptathlon

Badminton

Men

Women

Baseball

Baseball was open only to male amateurs in 1992 and 1996. As a result, the Americans and other nations where professional baseball is developed relied on collegiate players, while Cubans used their most experienced veterans, who technically were considered amateurs as they nominally held other jobs, but in fact trained full-time. In 2000, pros were admitted, but the MLB refused to release its players in 2000, 2004, and 2008, and the situation changed only a little: the Cubans still used their best players, while the Americans started using minor leaguers. The IOC cited the absence of the best players as the main reason for baseball being dropped from the Olympic program.

Summary

Preliminary Round
4-1 vs Spain
10-9 vs Chinese Taipei
10-0 vs Italy
6-9 vs Cuba
8-2 vs Puerto Rico
10-0 vs Dominican Republic
1-7 vs Japan
Semifinal
1-6 vs Cuba
Bronze Medal Game
3-8 vs Japan

Roster
Willie Adams
Jeff Alkire
Darren Dreifort
Nomar Garciaparra
Jason Giambi
Rick Greene
Jeffrey Hammonds
Rick Helling
Charles Johnson
Daron Kirkreit
Chad McConnell
Calvin Murray
Phil Nevin
Chris Roberts
Michael Tucker
Jason Varitek
Ron Villone
B. J. Wallace
Craig Wilson
Chris Wimmer

Basketball

Summary

Men's tournament

Roster

Group stage

Quarterfinal

Semifinal

Gold medal game

Women's tournament

Roster
 Vicky Bullett
 Daedra Charles
 Cynthia Cooper
 Clarissa Davis
 Medina Dixon
 Teresa Edwards
 Tammy Jackson
 Carolyn Jones
 Katrina McClain
 Suzie McConnell
 Vickie Orr
 Teresa Weatherspoon

Group stage

Semifinal

Bronze medal game

Boxing

Canoeing

Slalom

Men

Women

Sprint

Men

Women

Key: QF – Qualified to medal final; SF – Qualified to semifinal; R – Qualified to repechage

Cycling

Twenty cyclists represented the United States in 1992. Erin Hartwell won bronze in the men's 1 km time trial and Rebecca Twigg won bronze in the women's individual pursuit.

Road

Track

Points race

Pursuit

Sprint

Time trial

Diving

Men

Women

Equestrian

Dressage

Eventing

Jumping

Fencing

16 fencers represented the United States in 1992.

Men

Women

Football

Summary

Roster
Head coach: Lothar Osiander

Group stage

Gymnastics

Artistic

Men
Team

Individual finals

Women
Team

Individual finals

Rhythmic

Handball

Summary

Women's tournament
Preliminary round (group A)
 United States – Unified Team 16-23
 United States – Germany 16-32
 United States – Nigeria 23-21
Classification Match
 5th/6th place: United States – Austria 17-26
Team roster
Sharon Cain
Kim Clarke
Laura Coenen
Laurie Fellner
Tami Lyn Jameson
Leora Jones
Portia Lack
Dannette Leininger
Patricia Neder
Lori Lynn Ogren
Karyn Palgut
Carol Peterka
Angie Raynor
Barbara Schaaf
Cynthia Stinger
Chryssandra Watts
Head coach: Vojtech Mares
Coach: William Michael Connor

Judo

Men

Women

Modern pentathlon

Three pentathletes represented the United States in 1992.

Rowing

Men

Women

Qualification legend: FA=Final A (medal); FB=Final B (non-medal); FC=Final C (non-medal); FD=Final D (non-medal); SA/B=Semifinal A/B; SC/D=Semifinal C/D; R=Repechage

Sailing

Men

Women

Open
Fleet racing

Mixed racing

Shooting

Men

Women

Open shotgun

Swimming

Men

Women

* - Athlete swam in the heat but not the final.
Note: Times in the first round ranked across all heats.
Qualification legend: FA – Advance to medal final; FB – Advance to non-medal final

Synchronized swimming

Three female synchronized swimmers represented the United States in 1992.

Table tennis

Tennis

Men

Women

Volleyball

Summary

Men's tournament
Preliminary round (group A)
 Lost to Japan (1-3)
 Defeated Canada (3-2)
 Defeated Spain (3-2)
 Defeated France (3-0)
 Defeated Italy (3-1)
Quarterfinals
 Defeated Unified Team (3-1)
Semifinals
 Lost to Brazil (1-3)
Bronze-medal match
 Defeated Cuba (3-1)
Team roster
 Nick Becker
 Carlos Briceno
 Bob Ctvrtlik
 Scott Fortune
 Dan Greenbaum
 Brent Hilliard
 Bryan Ivie
 Doug Partie
 Bob Samuelson
 Eric Sato
 Jeff Stork
 Steve Timmons
Head coach: Fred Sturm

Women's tournament
Preliminary round (group A)
 Lost to Japan (2-3)
 Defeated Unified Team (3-2)
 Defeated Spain (3-0)
Quarterfinals
 Defeated Netherlands (3-1)
Semifinals
 Lost to Cuba (2-3)
Bronze-medal match
 Defeated Brazil (3-0)
Team roster
 Tara Cross-Battle
 Janet Cobbs
 Lori Endicott
 Caren Kemner
 Ruth Lawanson
 Tammy Liley
 Elaina Oden
 Kim Oden
 Teee Sanders
 Liane Sato
 Paula Weishoff
 Yoko Zetterlund
Head coach: Terry Liskevych

Water polo

Summary

Roster
Jeff Campbell
Christopher Duplanty
Mike Evans
Kirk Everist
Erich Fischer
Charles Harris
Chris Humbert
Douglas Kimbell
Craig Klass
Alex Rousseau
Terry Schroeder
John Vargas
Craig Wilson

Preliminary round

Semifinal

Bronze medal game

Weightlifting

Wrestling

See also
 United States at the 1991 Pan American Games

References

Nations at the 1992 Summer Olympics
1992
Oly